The Roman provinces (Latin: provincia, pl. provinciae) were the administrative regions of Ancient Rome outside Roman Italy that were controlled by the Romans under the Roman Republic and later the Roman Empire. Each province was ruled by a Roman appointed as governor.

For centuries it was the largest administrative unit of the foreign possessions of ancient Rome. With the administrative reform initiated by Diocletian, it became a third level administrative subdivision of the Roman Empire, or rather a subdivision of the imperial dioceses (in turn subdivisions of the imperial prefectures).

History 

A province was the basic and, until the Tetrarchy (from AD 293), the largest territorial and administrative unit of the empire's territorial possessions outside Roman Italy.

Provinces were generally governed by politicians of senatorial rank, usually former consuls or former praetors. A later exception was the province of Egypt, which was incorporated by Augustus after the death of Cleopatra and was ruled by a governor of only equestrian rank, perhaps as a discouragement to senatorial ambition. That exception was unique but not contrary to Roman law, as Egypt was considered Augustus's personal property, following the tradition of the kings of the earlier Hellenistic period.

Republican period 

The English word province comes from the Latin word provincia. The Latin term provincia had an equivalent in eastern, Greek-speaking parts of the Greco-Roman world. In the Greek language, province was called eparchy (eparchia). That term was used both colloquially and officially, in Roman legal acts that were issued in the Greek language. In the same time, provincial governor was called eparch (eparchos).

Emergence 

However, the Latin  referred not to a territory, as later came into use and persists in its English descendant. It originally to a task assigned to a Roman magistrate. In the middle and late republican authors like Plautus, Terence, and Cicero, the word referred something akin to a modern ministerial portfolio: "when... the senate assigned  to the various magistrates... what they were doing was more like allocating a portfolio than putting people in charge of geographic areas".

However, assigning a  did not mean Rome administered some territory. Even though the Second and Third Macedonian wars saw the Macedonian province revived, the senate settled affairs in the region by abolishing Macedona and replacing it with four client republics. Macedonia only fell under direct Roman administration in the aftermath of the Fourth Macedonian war in 148 BC, when the senate started to assign Macedonia as a province every year. Similarly, assignment of various  in Hispania was not accompanied by the creation of any regular administration of the area; indeed, even though two praetors were assigned to Hispania regularly from 196 BC, no systematic settlement of the region occurred for nearly thirty years and what administration occurred was ad hoc and emerged from military necessities. Rome had no uniform system of taxation and regularly engaged in largely indirect rule. Roman intervention in a foreign territorial dispute was regularly conducted ad hoc by delegating the matter to a praetor even when the foreign territories were not part of any province at all. For example, Manius Acilius Glabrio issued instructions to Delphi in early 190 BC even though the city was not part of the Roman empire.

Permanent provincia 

The acquisition of territories, however, through the middle republic created the recurrent task of defending and administering some place. The first "permanent"  was that of Sicily, created after the First Punic War. In the immediate aftermath, a quaestor was sent to Sicily to look out for Roman interests but eventually, praetors were dispatched as well. The sources differ as to when sending a praetor became normal: Appian reports 241 BC; Solinus indicates 227 BC instead. Regardless, the change likely reflected Roman unease about Carthaginian power: quaestors could not command armies or fleets; praetors could and initially seem to have held largely garrison duties. Instead of being a task of military expansion, it became a recurrent defensive assignment to oversee conquered territories. These defensive assignments, with few opportunities to gain glory, were less desirable and therefore became regularly assigned to the praetors. Only around 180 BC did provinces take on a more geographically-defined position when a border was established to separate the two commanders assigned to Hispania on the river Baetis. Later provinces, once campaigns were complete, were all largely defined geographically. Once this division of permanent and temporary  emerged, magistrates assigned to permanent provinces also came under pressures to achieve as much as possible during their terms. Whenever a military crisis occurred near some province, it was normally reassigned to one of the consuls; praetors were left with the garrison duties. In the permanent provinces, the Roman commanders were initially not intended as administrators. However, the presence of the commander with forces sufficient to coerce compliance made him an obvious place to seek final judgement. A governor's legal jurisdiction grew from the demands of the provincial inhabitants for authoritative settlement of disputes. 

In the absence of opportunities for conquest and with little oversight for their activities, many praetorian governors settled on extorting the provincials. This profiteering threatened Roman control by unnecessarily angering the province's subject populations and was regardless dishonourable. It eventually drew a reaction from the senate, which reacted with laws to rein in the governors. After initial experimentation with ad hoc panels of inquest, various laws were passed, such as the lex Calpurnia de repetundis in 149 BC, which established a permanent court to try corruption cases; troubles with corruption and laws reacting to it continued through the republican era. One of the important laws in this vein was the lex Porcia, which prohibited governors from leaving their provinces at the head of an army and was probably meant to stop praetors – who unlike consuls were assigned  with territorial boundaries – from starting unjustified private wars during their terms. By the end of the republic, a multitude of laws had been passed on how a governor would complete his task, requiring presence in the province, regulating how he could requisition goods from provincial communities, limiting the number of years he could serve in the province, etc.

Assignment 

Prior to 123 BC, the senate assigned consular provinces as it wished, usually in its first meeting of the consular year. The specific provinces to be assigned were normally determined by lot or by mutual agreement among the commanders; only extraordinarily did the senate assign a command  (outside of sortition). But in 123 or 122 BC, the tribune Gaius Sempronius Gracchus passed the lex Sempronia de provinciis consularibus, which required the senate to select the consular provinces before the consular elections and made this announcement immune from tribunician veto. The law had the effect of, over time, abolishing the temporary , as it was not always realistic for the senate to anticipate the theatres of war some six months in advance. Instead, the senate chose to assign consuls to permanent provinces near expected trouble spots. From 200 to 124 BC, only 22 per cent of recorded consular  were permanent provinces; between 122 and 53 BC, this rose to 60 per cent.

While many of the provinces had been assigned to sitting praetors in the earlier part of the second century, with new praetorships created to fill empty provincial commands, by the start of the first century it had become uncommon for praetors to hold provincial commands during their formal annual term. Instead they generally took command after their annual term ended by prorogation. This was due to the increased number of provinces needing commanders as well as the increased number of permanent courts (quaestiones perpetuae), each of which was presided over by a sitting praetor. During the time of the Second Punic War, a praetor prorogued took the rank pro praetore, but starting with the Spanish provinces and expanding by 167 BC, praetors were more commonly prorogued with the augmented rank proconsule, so that by the end of the republic, almost all praetors were so entitled.

Also important was the assertion of popular authority over the assignment of provincial commands. This started with Gaius Marius, who had an allied tribune introduce a law transferring to him the already-taken province of Numidia (then held by Quintus Caecilius Metellus), allowing Marius to assume command of the Jugurthine War. This innovation destabilised the system of assigning provincial commands and later allowed ambitious politicians to assemble for themselves enormous commands, such as the Pompeian lex Gabinia of 67 BC (giving him all land within 50 miles of the Mediterranean) and Caesar's Gallic commands that encompassed three normal provinces.

Transition to empire 

The increasing practices of prorogation and statutorily-defined "super commands" driven by  political tactics undermined the republican constitutional principle of annually-elected magistracies. This allowed the powerful men to amass disproportionate wealth and military power through their provincial commands, which was one of the major factors in the transition from a republic to an imperial autocracy.

The senate attempted to push back against these commands in many instances: it preferred to break up any large war into multiple territorially separated commands; for similar reasons, it opposed the lex Gabinia which gave Pompey an overlapping command over large portions of the Mediterranean. The senate, which had long acted as a check on aristocratic ambitions, was unable to stop these immense commands, which culminated eventually with the reduction of the number of meaningfully-independent governors during the triumviral period to three men and, with the end of the republic, to one man.

Early imperial period  

At the start of 27 BC, Augustus formally had a provincial commands over all of Rome's provinces. That year, in his "first settlement", he served in his seventh consulship and ostentatiously returned his control of them and their attached armies to the senate, likely by declaring that the task assigned to him either by the lex Titia creating the Triumvirate or in terms of the war on Cleopatra and Antony was complete. In return, at a carefully-managed meeting of the senate, he was given commands over Spain, Gaul, Syria, Cilicia, Cyprus, and Egypt to hold for ten years; these provinces contained 22 of the 28 extant Roman legions (over 80 per cent) and contained all possible or prospective military theatres.

The provinces that were assigned to Augustus became known as imperial provinces and the remaining provinces, largely demilitarised and confined to the older republican conquests, became known as public or senatorial provinces, as their commanders were still assigned by the senate on an annual basis consistent with tradition. Because no one man could command in practically all the border-regions of the empire at once, Augustus appointed subordinate legates for each of the provinces with the title legatus Augusti pro praetore. These lieutenant legati probably held imperium but, due to their lack of an independent command, were unable to triumph and could be replaced by their superior (Augustus) at any time. In contrast, the public provinces continued to be governed by proconsuls with formally independent commands. In only three of the public provinces were there any armies to command: Africa, Illyricum, and Macedonia; after Augustus' Balkan wars, only Africa retained a legion.

To make this monopolisation of military commands palatable, Augustus separated prestige from military importance and inverted it. The title pro praetore had gone out of use by the end of the republic and was regardless in inferior status to a proconsul. More radically, Egypt (which was sufficiently powerful that a commander there could start a rebellion against the emperor) was commanded by a equestrian prefect, "a very low title indeed" as prefects were normally low-ranking officers and equestrians were not normally part of the elite. In Augustus' "second settlement" of 23 BC, he gave up his continual holding of the consulship in exchange for a general proconsulship – with a special dispensation from the law that nullified imperium within the city of Rome – over the imperial provinces. He also gave himself, through the senate, a general grant of imperium maius, which gave him priority over the ordinary governors of the public provinces, allowing him to interfere in their affairs.

Late imperial period 

The emperor Diocletian introduced a radical reform known as the tetrarchy (AD 284–305), with a western and an eastern senior emperor styled Augustus, each seconded by a junior emperor (and designated successor) styled caesar. Each of these four defended and administered a quarter of the empire. In the 290s, Diocletian divided the empire anew into almost a hundred provinces, including Roman Italy. Their governors were hierarchically ranked, from the proconsuls of Africa Proconsularis and Asia through those governed by consulares and correctores to the praesides. The provinces in turn were grouped into (originally twelve) dioceses, headed usually by a vicarius, who oversaw their affairs. Only the proconsuls and the urban prefect of Rome (and later Constantinople) were exempt from this, and were directly subordinated to the tetrarchs.

Although the Caesars were soon eliminated from the picture, the four administrative resorts were restored in 318 by Emperor Constantine I, in the form of praetorian prefectures, whose holders generally rotated frequently, as in the usual magistracies but without a colleague. Constantine also created a new capital, named after him as Constantinople, which was sometimes called 'New Rome' because it became the permanent seat of the government. In Italy itself, Rome had not been the imperial residence for some time and 286 Diocletian formally moved the seat of government to Mediolanum (modern Milan), while taking up residence himself in Nicomedia. During the 4th century, the administrative structure was modified several times, including repeated experiments with Eastern-Western co-emperors. 

Detailed information on the arrangements during this period is contained in the Notitia Dignitatum (Record of Offices), a document dating from the early 5th century. Most data is drawn from this authentic imperial source, as the names of the areas governed and titles of the governors are given there. Some scholars compare this with the list of military territories under the duces, in charge of border garrisons on so-called limites, and the higher ranking , with more mobile forces, and the later, even higher magistri militum.

Justinian I made the next great changes in 534–536 by abolishing, in some provinces, the strict separation of civil and military authority that Diocletian had established.This process was continued on a larger scale with the creation of extraordinary Exarchates in the 580s and culminated with the adoption of the military theme system in the 640s, which replaced the older administrative arrangements entirely. Some scholars use the reorganization of the empire into themata in this period as one of the demarcations between the Dominate and the Byzantine (or the Later Roman) period.

List of provinces

Republican provinces 
 241 BC – Sicilia (Sicily) taken over from the Carthaginians and annexed at the end of the First Punic War
 237 BC – Sardinia and Corsica; these two islands were taken over from the Carthaginians and annexed soon after the Mercenary War, in 238 BC and 237 BC respectively
 197 BC – Hispania Citerior; along the east coast of the Iberian Peninsula; part of the territories taken over from the Carthaginians
 197 BC – Hispania Ulterior; along the southern coast of the Iberian Peninsula; part of the territories taken over from the Carthaginians in the Second Punic War
 147 BC – Macedonia was annexed after the Achaean War
 146 BC – Africa (modern-day Tunisia, eastern Algeria and western Libya); created after the destruction of Carthage in the Third Punic War
 129 BC – Asia, formerly the Kingdom of Pergamon, in western Anatolia (now in Turkey), bequeathed to Rome by its last king, Attalus III, in 133 BC.
 120 BC – Gallia Narbonensis (southern France); prior to its annexation it was called Gallia Transalpina (Gallia on the other side of the Alps) to distinguish it from Gallia Cisalpina (Gaul on this same side of the Alps, in northern Italy). It was annexed following attacks on the allied Greek city of Massalia (Marseille).
 67 BC – Crete and Cyrenaica; Cyrenaica was bequeathed to Rome in 78 BC. However, it was not organised as a province. It was incorporated into the province of Creta et Cyrenae when Crete was annexed in 67 BC.
 63 BC – Bithynia et Pontus; the Kingdom of Bithynia (in North-western Anatolia) was bequeathed to Rome by its last king, Nicomedes IV, in 74 BC. It was organised as a Roman province at the end of the Third Mithridatic War (73–63 BC) by Pompey, who incorporated the western part of the defeated Kingdom of Pontus into it in 63 BC.
 63 BC – Syria; Pompey deposed the last Seleucid king Philip II Philoromaeus, creating the province of Syria.
 63 BC – Cilicia; Cilicia was created as a province in the sense of area of military command in 102 BC in a campaign against piracy. The Romans controlled only a small area. In 74 BC Lycia and Pamphylia (to the east) were added to the small Roman possessions in Cilicia. Cilicia came fully under Roman control at the end of the Third Mithridatic War (73–63 BC), reorganised by Pompey in 63 BC.  
 58 BC – Cyprus was annexed and added to the province of Cilicia, creating the province of Cilicia et Cyprus.
 46 BC – Africa Nova (Eastern Numidia – Algeria), Julius Caesar annexed Eastern Numidia and the new province called Africa Nova (new Africa) to distinguish it from the older province of Africa, created in 146 BC, which became known as Africa Vetus (old Africa). Western Numidia was annexed and added to the province of  Africa Nova in 40 BC. The territory remained the direct part of the Roman Empire except for a brief period when Augustus restored Juba II (son of Juba I) as a client king (30–25 BC).

Cisalpine Gaul (in northern Italy) was occupied by Rome in the 220s BC and became considered geographically and de facto part of Roman Italy, but remained politically and de jure separated. It was legally merged into the administrative unit of Roman Italy in 42 BC by the triumvir Augustus as a ratification of Caesar's unpublished acts (Acta Caesaris).

Provinces of the Principate

Under Augustus 
 30 BC – Aegyptus, taken over by Augustus after his defeat of Mark Antony and Cleopatra VII in 30 BC. It was the first imperial province in that it was Augustus' own domain as the Egyptians recognised him as their new pharaoh. Its proper initial name was Alexandrea et Aegyptus. It was governed by Augustus' praefectus, Alexandreae et Aegypti.
 27 BC – Achaia (southern and central Greece), Augustus separated it from Macedonia (senatorial propraetorial province)
 27 BC – Hispania Tarraconensis; former Hispania Citerior (northern, central and eastern Spain), created with the reorganisation of the provinces in Hispania by Augustus (imperial proconsular province).
 27 BC – Lusitania (Portugal and Extremadura in Spain), created with the reorganisation of the provinces in Hispania by Augustus (imperial proconsular province)
 27 BC – Illyricum, Augustus conquered Illyria and southern Pannonia in 35–33 BC. Created as a senatorial province in 27 BC. Northern Pannonia was conquered during the Pannonian War (14–10 BC). Subdivided into Dalmatia (a new name for Illyria) and Pannonia, which were officially called Upper and Lower Illyricum respectively in 9 BC, towards the end of the Batonian War. Initially a senatorial province, it became an imperial propraetorial province in 11 BC, during the Pannonian War. It was dissolved and the new provinces of Dalmatia and Pannonia were created during the reign of Vespasian (69–79). In 107, Pannonia was divided into Pannonia Superior and Pannonia Inferior – imperial provinces (proconsular and propraetorial respectively).
 27 BC or 16–13 BC – Aquitania (south-western France) province created in the territories in Gaul conquered by Julius Caesar; there is uncertainty as to whether it was created with Augustus’ first visit and the first census on Gaul or during Augustus' visit in 16–13 (imperial proconsular province)
 27 BC or 16–13 BC – Gallia Lugdunensis (central and part of northern France) province created in the territories in Gaul conquered by Julius Caesar; there is uncertainty as to whether it was created with Augustus’ first visit and the first census on Gaul or during Augustus’ visit in 16–13 (imperial proconsular province)
 25 BC – Galatia (central Anatolia, Turkey), formerly a client kingdom, it was annexed by Augustus when Amyntas, its last king, died (imperial propraetorial province)
 25 BC – Africa Proconsularis. The client kingdom of Numidia under king Juba II (30 - 25 BC), previously between 46 - 30 BC the  province Africa Nova, was abolished, and merged with the province Africa Vetus, creating the province Africa Proconsularis (except territory of Western Numidia).
 22 BC – Gallia Belgica (Netherlands south of the Rhine river, Belgium, Luxembourg, part of northern France and Germany west of the Rhine; there is uncertainty as to whether it was created with Augustus’ first visit and the first census on Gaul or during Augustus' visit in 16–13 (imperial proconsular province)
 15 BC – Raetia (imperial procuratorial province)
 14 BC – Hispania Baetica; former Hispania Ulterior (southern Spain); created with the reorganisation of the provinces in Hispania by Augustus (senatorial propraetorial province). The name derives from Betis, the Latin name for the Guadalquivir River.
 7 BC – Germania Antiqua, lost after three Roman legions were routed in 9 AD
  AD 6? – Moesia (on the east and south bank of the River Danube part of modern Serbia, the north part of North Macedonia, northern Bulgaria), Conquered in 28 BC, originally it was a military district under the province of Macedonia. The first mention of a provincial governor was for 6 AD, at the beginning of the Batonian War. In 85 Moesia was divided into Moesia Superior and Moesia Inferior (imperial proconsular provinces).
  AD 6 – Judaea, imperial procuratorial province, created after the deposition of ethnarch Herod Archelaus, formed initially from the territory of Samaria, Judea, and Idumea. Reverted to the status of client kingdom under king Herod Agrippa in AD 41 by Claudius and became province again after Agrippa's death in AD 44, enlarged by territories of Galilee and Peraea; renamed Syria Palaestina by Hadrian in AD 135 and upgraded to proconsular province.

Under Tiberius 
 AD 17 – Cappadocia (central Anatolia – Turkey); imperial propraetorial (later proconsular) province, created after the death of its last client king Archelaus.

Under Claudius 
 AD 42 – Mauretania Tingitana (northern Morocco); after the death of Ptolemy, the last king of Mauretania, in AD 40, his kingdom was annexed. It was begun by Caligula and was completed by Claudius with the defeat of the rebels. In AD 42, Claudius divided it into two provinces (imperial procuratorial province).
 AD 42 – Mauretania Caesariensis, (western and central Algeria), after the death of Ptolemy, the last king of Mauretania, in AD 40, his kingdom was annexed. It was begun by Caligula and was completed by Claudius with the defeat of the rebels. In AD 42 Claudius divided it into two provinces( imperial procuratorial province).
  AD 41/53 – Noricum (central Austria, north-eastern Slovenia and part of Bavaria), it was incorporated into the empire in 16 BC. It was called a province, but it remained a client kingdom under the control of an imperial procurator. It was turned into a proper province during the reign of Claudius (41–54) (imperial propraetorial province).
 AD 43 – Britannia; Claudius initiated the invasion of Britannia. Up to AD 60, the Romans controlled the area south a line from the River Humber to the Severn Estuary. Wales was finally subdued in 78. In 78–84 Agricola conquered the north of England and Scotland. Scotland was then abandoned (imperial proconsular province). In 197 Septimius Severus divided Britannia into Britannia Superior and Britannia Inferior. Imperial provinces (proconsular and propraetorial respectively).
 AD 43 – Lycia annexed by Claudius (in 74 AD merged with Pamphylia to form Lycia et Pamphylia).
 AD 46 – Thracia (Thrace, north-eastern Greece, south-eastern Bulgaria and European Turkey), it was annexed by Claudius (imperial procuratorial province).
 AD 47? – Alpes Atrectianae et Poeninae (between Italy and Switzerland), Augustus subdued its inhabitants, the Salassi, in 15 BC. It was incorporated into Raetia. The date of the creation of the province is uncertain. It is usually set at the date of Claudius' foundation of Forum Claudii Vallensium (Martigny), which became its capital (imperial procuratorial province).

Under Nero 
 AD 62 – Pontus (the eastern half of the Kingdom of Pontus) together with Colchis annexed, later incorporated in the Province of Cappadocia (probably under Emperor Trajan).
 AD 63 – Bosporan Kingdom incorporated as part of the Roman province of Moesia Inferior. In 68 AD Galba restored the Bosporan Kingdom as a client kingdom.
 AD 63? – Alpes Maritimae (on the French Alps), created as a protectorate by Augustus, it probably became a province under Nero when Alpes Cottiae became a province (imperial procuratorial province)
 AD 63 – Alpes Cottiae (between France and Italy), in 14 BC it became a nominal prefecture which was run by the ruling dynasty of the Cotii. It was named after the king, Marcus Julius Cottius. It became a province in 63 (imperial procuratorial province).

Under Vespasian 
 AD 72 – Commagene, its last client king Antiochus IV was deposed and Commagene was annexed to Syria.
 AD 72 – Lesser Armenia, its last client king Aristobulus of Chalcis was deposed and Lesser Armenia was annexed to Syria.
 AD 72 – Western mountainous parts of Cilicia, formed into three client kingdoms established by Augustus, were disestablished, and merged with the imperial province of Cilicia. 
 AD 74 – Lycia et Pamphylia. Vespasian (reigned AD 69–79) merged Lycia, annexed by Claudius, and Pamphylia which had been a part of the province of Galatia.

Under Domitian 
 AD 83/84 – Germania Superior (southern Germany) The push into southern Germany up to the Agri Decumates by Domitian created the necessity to create this province, which had been a military district in Gallia Belgica when it was restricted to the west bank of the River Rhine (imperial proconsular province).
 AD 83/84 – Germania Inferior (Netherlands south of the River Rhine, part of Belgium, and part of Germany west of the Rhine) originally a military district under Gallia Belgica, created when Germania Superior was created (imperial proconsular province).
 AD 92 – Chalcis was annexed to Syria after the death of its last ruler, tetrarch Aristobulus of Chalcis.

Under Trajan 
 AD 100 – Territories of Iturea, Trachonitis, Batanea, Gaulanitis, Auranitis and Paneas were annexed to Syria after the death of king Herod Agrippa II.
 AD 106 – Arabia, formerly the Kingdom of Nabataea, it was annexed without resistance by Trajan (imperial propraetorial province)
 AD 107 – Dacia "Trajana" (the Romanian regions of south-eastern Transylvania, the Banat, and Oltenia), conquered by Trajan in the Dacian Wars (imperial proconsular province). Divided into Dacia Superior and Dacia Inferior in 158 by Antoninus Pius. Divided into three provinces (Tres Daciae) in 166 by Marcus Aurelius: Porolissensis, Apulensis and Malvensis (imperial procuratorial provinces). Abandoned by Aurelian in 271.
 AD 103/114 - Epirus Nova (in western Greece and southern Albania), Epirus was originally under the province of Macedonia. It was placed under Achaia in 27 BC except for its northernmost part, which remained part of Macedonia. It became a separate province under Trajan, sometime between 103 and 114 AD, and was renamed Epirus Nova (New Epirus) (imperial procuratorial province).
 AD 114 – Armenia, annexed by Trajan, who deposed its client king. In 118 Hadrian restored this client kingdom
 AD 116 – Mesopotamia (Iraq) seized from the Parthians and annexed by Trajan, who invaded the Parthian Empire in late 115. Given back to the Parthians by Hadrian in 118. In 198 Septimius Severus conquered a small area in the north and named it Mesopotamia. It was attacked twice by the Persians (imperial praefectorial province).
 AD 116 – Assyria, Trajan suppressed a revolt by Assyrians in Mesopotamia and created the province. Hadrian relinquished it in 118.

Under Septimius Severus 
 AD 193 – Numidia, was separated from Africa Proconsularis by Septimius Severus (imperial propraetorial province).
 AD 194 – Syria Coele and Syria Phoenice, Septimius Severus divided Syria into these two units in the north and the south respectively. Imperial provinces (proconsular and propraetorial respectively).

Under Caracalla 
 AD 214 – Osrhoene, this kingdom (in northern Mesopotamia, in parts of today's Iraq, Syria and Turkey) was annexed.

Under Aurelian 
 AD 271 – Dacia Aureliana (most of Bulgaria and Serbia) created by Aurelian in the territory of the former Moesia Superior after his evacuation of Dacia Trajana beyond the River Danube.

Many of the above provinces were under Roman military control or under the rule of Roman clients for a long time before being officially constituted as civil provinces. Only the date of the official formation of the province is marked above, not the date of conquest.

Provinces of the late empire

Primary sources for lists of provinces

Early Roman Empire provinces
 Germania (ca. 100)
 Geography (Ptolemy) (ca. 140)

Late Roman Empire provinces
 Laterculus Veronensis (ca. 310)
 Notitia dignitatum (ca. 400–420)
 Laterculus Polemii Silvii (ca. 430)
 Synecdemus (ca. 520)

See also 

 Ancient geography
 Classical antiquity
 Early world maps
 Ecumene
 Geography
 History of cartography
 History of the Mediterranean region
 Latin spelling and pronunciation
 List of Graeco-Roman geographers
 List of historical maps
 Local government (ancient Roman)

References

Citations

Sources 
 Modern sources

  
 
 
 

 
 
 
 
 
 

 Other sources

External links 

 Map of the Roman Empire in the year 300
 https://web.archive.org/web/20060409205643/http://www.ancientlibrary.com/smith-dgra/

 
Historical regions
Provinces